Kevin Neufeld (November 6, 1960 in St. Catharines, Ontario – February 26, 2022) was a Canadian rower, who was a member of the Canadian men's eights team that won the gold medal at the 1984 Summer Olympics in Los Angeles, California.  He had previously won a gold medal in the eights at the world championships in 1983, and subsequently  won a gold medal in the coxless four at the 1986 Commonwealth Games at Strathclyde Country Park.  He died on February 26, 2022.

References

 Canadian Olympic Committee

1960 births
2022 deaths
Canadian male rowers
Olympic gold medalists for Canada
Olympic medalists in rowing
Olympic rowers of Canada
Rowers at the 1984 Summer Olympics
Rowers at the 1988 Summer Olympics
Rowers from St. Catharines
Medalists at the 1984 Summer Olympics
Rowers at the 1986 Commonwealth Games
Commonwealth Games medallists in rowing
Commonwealth Games gold medallists for Canada
Medallists at the 1986 Commonwealth Games